Reynolds Township may refer to:

Canada 
 Reynolds Township, in Timiskaming District, Ontario

United States 
 Reynolds Township, Greene County, Arkansas, in Greene County, Arkansas
 Reynolds Township, Lee County, Illinois
 Reynolds Township, Montcalm County, Michigan
 Reynolds Township, Todd County, Minnesota

Township name disambiguation pages